Jenne Block is a two-story brick commercial building in downtown Douglas, Wyoming. It is described as the most ornate commercial building in Douglas, with extensive terra cotta detailing. It was built for rancher and businessman Jacob Jenne by contractor Edward A. Reavill in 1916. The building housed a bank and the local Douglas Enterprise newspaper, as well as professional offices.

Description
The corner entrance is set at an angle to face the intersection of Center and South Third Streets and is topped by a terra cotta crest with a JJ monogram. A raised entry at the middle of the long side provides access to the upper floors, with a basement stair set underneath. The elevations that do not face the street are blank expanses of brick.

Jenne Block was listed on the National Register of Historic Places on January 6, 1998.

See also
Morton Mansion (Douglas, Wyoming), built for Jacob Jenne's brother John (Jenne) Morton in Douglas

References

External links
 Jenne Block (Building) at the Wyoming State Historic Preservation Office

National Register of Historic Places in Converse County, Wyoming
Buildings and structures completed in 1916
Buildings designated early commercial in the National Register of Historic Places